The 1981 Toronto Blue Jays season was the franchise's fifth season competing in Major League Baseball. Games were suspended for 50 days due to the 1981 Major League Baseball strike, causing a split season. The Blue Jays finished both halves of the season in seventh place in the seven-team American League East. Managed by Bobby Mattick, the Blue Jays played their home games at Exhibition Stadium and had an overall record of 37 wins and 69 losses.

Offseason
 December 8, 1980: 1980 rule 5 draft
George Bell was drafted by the Blue Jays from the Philadelphia Phillies.
Dan Whitmer was drafted by the Blue Jays from the California Angels.
 January 15, 1981: Ken Macha was purchased by the Blue Jays from the Montreal Expos.

Regular season
The Blue Jays were one of the worst teams in the majors in the first half of the split season, as the Blue Jays had a record of 16 wins and 42 losses, a percentage of .276. Although the Blue Jays had future stars Jesse Barfield, George Bell, and Lloyd Moseby in the lineup, the team continued to struggle.

On May 15, 1981, Len Barker of the Cleveland Indians pitched a perfect game against the Blue Jays. It was the tenth perfect game ever pitched, is one of only seventeen in the history of the major leagues, and remains the last no-hitter thrown by an Indian.

The result of the season was one of the more controversial times in franchise history. The President of the Blue Jays, Peter Bavasi, went to see the team in Anaheim against the California Angels. Bavasi's father, Buzzie Bavasi was the president of the Angels, and his team had gotten off to a lackluster start. Buzzie wanted to fire Angels manager Jim Fregosi, and Peter Bavasi had the idea to fire his manager, Bobby Mattick. Both thought it would be big news if father and son fired their manager on the same night. One of the Blue Jays executives advised the Jays Vice-Chairman of the Board, Peter Hardy. After a brief conversation, Hardy made it clear to Peter Bavasi that Mattick would not be fired in this way.

After the strike was resolved, the Blue Jays started the second half of the season with a close to .500 winning percentage. Peter Bavasi was heard to muse aloud the requirement to print World Series tickets. The Jays would finish the second half with 21 wins and 27 losses, seven and a half games out of first place. Despite the attempted Bavasi firing, Mattick would resign as manager at the end of the season. On November 22, 1981, Hardy forced Bavasi to resign from the Blue Jays.

Season standings

Record vs. opponents

Opening Day starters
 Danny Ainge
 Barry Bonnell
 Jim Clancy
 Dámaso García
 Alfredo Griffin
 John Mayberry
 Lloyd Moseby
 Otto Vélez
 Ernie Whitt
 Al Woods

Notable transactions
June 8, 1981: 1981 Major League Baseball draft
Matt Williams was drafted by the Blue Jays in the 1st round (5th pick).
Mike Sharperson was drafted by the Blue Jays in the 1st round (11th pick) of the Secondary Phase.
 June 10, 1981: Rick Bosetti was purchased from the Blue Jays by the Oakland Athletics.

Roster

Game log

|- align="center" bgcolor="ffbbbb"
| 1 || April 9 || @ Tigers || 6–2 || Morris (1–0) || McLaughlin (0–1) || || 51,452 || 0–1
|- align="center" bgcolor="ffbbbb"
| 2 || April 11 || @ Tigers || 6–2 || Wilcox (1–0) || Stieb (0–1) || || 13,617 || 0–2
|- align="center" bgcolor="bbffbb"
| 3 || April 12 || @ Tigers || 6–2 || Leal (1–0) || Bailey (0–1) || || 9,950 || 1–2
|- align="center" bgcolor="bbffbb"
| 4 || April 13 || Yankees || 5–1 || Clancy (1–0) || John (1–1) || Jackson (1) || 25,112 || 2–2
|- align="center" bgcolor="ffbbbb"
| 5 || April 15 || Yankees || 6–3 || May (2–0) || Todd (0–1) || Gossage (1) || 16,280 || 2–3
|- align="center" bgcolor="ffbbbb"
| 6 || April 16 || Tigers || 2–0 || Wilcox (2–0) || Stieb (0–2) || López (1) || 11,058 || 2–4
|- align="center" bgcolor="ffbbbb"
| 7 || April 17 || Tigers || 8–5 || Bailey (1–1) || Leal (1–1) || Saucier (1) || 15,196 || 2–5
|- align="center" bgcolor="ffbbbb"
| 8 || April 18 || Tigers || 4–3 || Schatzeder (1–0) || Clancy (1–1) || López (2) || 16,294 || 2–6
|- align="center" bgcolor="bbffbb"
| 9 || April 19 || Tigers || 9–1 || Bomback (1–0) || Morris (1–1) || || 12,274 || 3–6
|- align="center" bgcolor="ffbbbb"
| 10 || April 20 || Brewers || 5–4 (12) || Lerch (1–0) || Willis (0–1)  || || 12,298 || 3–7
|- align="center" bgcolor="ffbbbb"
| 11 || April 21 || Brewers || 6–2 || Haas (1–0) || Stieb (0–3) || || 11,083 || 3–8
|- align="center" bgcolor="ffbbbb"
| 12 || April 22 || Brewers || 8–1 || Caldwell (2–1) || Leal (1–2) || || 11,792 || 3–9
|- align="center" bgcolor="bbbbbb"
| – || April 23 || @ Yankees || colspan=6|Postponed (rain) Not rescheduled
|- align="center" bgcolor="ffbbbb"
| 13 || April 24 || @ Yankees || 4–2 || John (2–1) || Bomback (1–1) || Gossage (4) || 20,863 || 3–10
|- align="center" bgcolor="bbffbb"
| 14 || April 25 || @ Yankees || 7–2 || Todd (1–1) || May (3–1) || || 17,319 || 4–10
|- align="center" bgcolor="bbffbb"
| 15 || April 26 || @ Yankees || 2–1 || Stieb (1–3) || Underwood (0–2) || || 37,306 || 5–10
|- align="center" bgcolor="ffbbbb"
| 16 || April 27 || @ Brewers || 4–3 (12) || Cleveland (1–0) || Garvin (0–1) || || 6,692 || 5–11
|- align="center" bgcolor="bbffbb"
| 17 || April 28 || @ Brewers || 6–2 || Bomback (2–1) || Caldwell (2–2) || || 6,433 || 6–11
|- align="center" bgcolor="bbffbb"
| 18 || April 29 || @ Brewers || 5–0 (14) || Leal (2–2) || Easterly (0–1) || || 7,320 || 7–11
|- align="center" bgcolor="ffbbbb"
| 19 || April 30 || @ Orioles || 4–0 || Flanagan (2–2) || Todd (1–2) || || 7,726 || 7–12
|-

|- align="center" bgcolor="bbbbbb"
| – || May 1 || @ Orioles || colspan=6|Postponed (rain) Rescheduled for May 2
|- align="center" bgcolor="ffbbbb"
| 20 || May 2 || @ Orioles || 4–3 || Palmer (1–0) || Willis (0–2) || || || 7–13
|- align="center" bgcolor="ffbbbb"
| 21 || May 2 || @ Orioles || 8–3 || McGregor (2–1) || Leal (2–3) || || 16,402 || 7–14
|- align="center" bgcolor="bbffbb"
| 22 || May 3 || @ Orioles || 4–2 || Bomback (3–1) || Stone (1–3) || McLaughlin (1) || 23,898 || 8–14
|- align="center" bgcolor="bbbbbb"
| – || May 5 || Indians || colspan=6|Postponed (rain) Rescheduled for July 19
|- align="center" bgcolor="ffbbbb"
| 23 || May 6 || Indians || 4–1 || Blyleven (3–1) || Todd (1–3) || || 11,469 || 8–15
|- align="center" bgcolor="bbffbb"
| 24 || May 7 || Indians || 6–2 || Stieb (2–3) || Waits (3–1) || || 11,328 || 9–15
|- align="center" bgcolor="ffbbbb"
| 25 || May 8 || Red Sox || 4–2 || Torrez (2–2) || Bomback (3–2) || Burgmeier (3) || 15,106 || 9–16
|- align="center" bgcolor="ffbbbb"
| 26 || May 9 || Red Sox || 10–3 || Stanley (3–1) || Clancy (1–2) || || 16,040 || 9–17
|- align="center" bgcolor="ffbbbb"
| 27 || May 10 || Red Sox || 9–5 (10) || Burgmeier (2–0) || Jackson (0–1) || || 17,411 || 9–18
|- align="center" bgcolor="ffbbbb"
| 28 || May 11 || Red Sox || 7–6 || Clear (2–0) || Willis (0–3) || || 11,315 || 9–19
|- align="center" bgcolor="bbffbb"
| 29 || May 12 || Orioles || 5–2 || Stieb (3–3) || Palmer (1–1) || || 11,354 || 10–19
|- align="center" bgcolor="ffbbbb"
| 30 || May 13 || Orioles || 4–0 || McGregor (3–1) || Bomback (3–3) || || 12,568 || 10–20
|- align="center" bgcolor="ffbbbb"
| 31 || May 14 || Orioles || 10–0 || Flanagan (4–3) || Clancy (1–3) || || 11,509 || 10–21
|- align="center" bgcolor="ffbbbb"
| 32 || May 15 || @ Indians || 3–0 || Barker (3–1) || Leal (2–4) || || 7,290 || 10–22
|- align="center" bgcolor="bbffbb"
| 33 || May 16 || @ Indians || 4–1 || Todd (2–3) || Garland (2–3) || || 24,964 || 11–22
|- align="center" bgcolor="ffbbbb"
| 34 || May 17 || @ Indians || 1–0 || Waits (4–2) || Stieb (3–4) || Monge (1) || || 11–23
|- align="center" bgcolor="ffbbbb"
| 35 || May 17 || @ Indians || 2–1 (10)|| Blyleven (5–1) || Jackson (0–2) || || 46,168 || 11–24
|- align="center" bgcolor="ffbbbb"
| 36 || May 18 || White Sox || 7–2 || Trout (3–1) || Bomback (3–4) || || 18,652 || 11–25
|- align="center" bgcolor="bbffbb"
| 37 || May 19 || White Sox || 9–5 || Clancy (2–3) || Hoyt (3–1) || Leal (1) || 11,604 || 12–25
|- align="center" bgcolor="ffbbbb"
| 38 || May 20 || White Sox || 6–5 || Farmer (1–2) || McLaughlin (0–2) || Hoyt (5) || 12,536 || 12–26
|- align="center" bgcolor="ffbbbb"
| 39 || May 22 || @ Athletics || 6–2 || Langford (5–4) || Stieb (3–5) || || 13,426 || 12–27
|- align="center" bgcolor="ffbbbb"
| 40 || May 23 || @ Athletics || 3–2 (15)|| Jones (3–1) || Leal (2–5) || || 27,147 || 12–28
|- align="center" bgcolor="ffbbbb"
| 41 || May 24 || @ Athletics || 6–5 (12)|| Owchinko (2–1) || McLaughlin (0–3) || || || 12–29
|- align="center" bgcolor="ffbbbb"
| 42 || May 24 || @ Athletics || 5–0 || Norris (7–2) || Garvin (0–2) || || 32,985 || 12–30
|- align="center" bgcolor="ffbbbb"
| 43 || May 25 || @ Angels || 2–1 || Witt (3–4) || Todd (2–4) || Hassler (3) || 22,171 || 12–31
|- align="center" bgcolor="bbffbb"
| 44 || May 26 || @ Angels || 8–4 || Jackson (1–2) || Rau (1–2) || McLaughlin (2) || 21,222 || 13–31
|- align="center" bgcolor="bbffbb"
| 45 || May 27 || @ Angels || 3–1 || Stieb (4–5) || Forsch (6–3) || || 21,167 || 14–31
|- align="center" bgcolor="bbffbb"
| 46 || May 29 || Athletics || 6–3 || Clancy (3–3) || Keough (6–2) || Jackson (2) || 16,509 || 15–31
|- align="center" bgcolor="bbffbb"
| 47 || May 30 || Athletics || 6–5 || Leal (3–5) || Norris (7–3) || McLaughlin (3) || 21,046 || 16–31
|- align="center" bgcolor="ffbbbb"
| 48 || May 31 || Athletics || 6–5 || Owchinko (3–1) || McLaughlin (0–4) || || 24,079 || 16–32
|-

|- align="center" bgcolor="ffbbbb"
| 49 || June 1 || Angels || 3–0 || Forsch (7–3) || Stieb (4–6) || || 12,268 || 16–33
|- align="center" bgcolor="ffbbbb"
| 50 || June 2 || Angels || 3–0 || Frost (1–0) || Leal (3–6) || Hassler (4) || 12,617 || 16–34
|- align="center" bgcolor="ffbbbb"
| 51 || June 3 || Angels || 17–6 || Zahn (6–6) || Clancy (3–4) || || 12,401 || 16–35
|- align="center" bgcolor="ffbbbb"
| 52 || June 5 || @ Rangers || 5–4 (12)|| Comer (4–1) || Leal (3–7) || || 11,495 || 16–36
|- align="center" bgcolor="ffbbbb"
| 53 || June 6 || @ Rangers || 4–1 || Jenkins (4–4) || Stieb (4–7) || || 24,312 || 16–37
|- align="center" bgcolor="ffbbbb"
| 54 || June 7 || @ Rangers || 9–0 || Darwin (7–4) || Todd (2–5) || || 14,857 || 16–38
|- align="center" bgcolor="ffbbbb"
| 55 || June 8 || @ White Sox || 6–2 || Lamp (2–1) || Clancy (3–5) || Hickey (1) || 8,301 || 16–39
|- align="center" bgcolor="ffbbbb"
| 56 || June 9 || @ White Sox || 3–0 || Dotson (7–3) || Leal (3–8) || || 8,534 || 16–40
|- align="center" bgcolor="ffbbbb"
| 57 || June 10 || Royals || 7–4 || Leonard (6–7) || Bomback (3–5) || || 19,098 || 16–41
|- align="center" bgcolor="ffbbbb"
| 58 || June 11 || Royals || 10–5 || Martin (2–3) || Willis (0–4) || Quisenberry (9) || 16,498 || 16–42
|-

|- align="center" bgcolor="ffbbbb"
| 59 || August 10 || @ Tigers || 4–3 || Saucier (1–0) || McLaughlin (0–5) || || 15,187 || 16–43
|- align="center" bgcolor="bbffbb"
| 60 || August 11 || @ Tigers || 6–4 || Berenguer (1–4) || Schatzeder (3–5) || Jackson (3) || 10,526 || 17–43
|- align="center" bgcolor="bbffbb"
| 61 || August 12 || @ Tigers || 4–3 || Stieb (5–7) || Morris (9–4) || Jackson (4) || 8,775 || 18–43
|- align="center" bgcolor="bbffbb"
| 62 || August 14 || Brewers || 5–4 || Garvin (1–2) || Easterly (2–2) || Jackson (5) || 15,114 || 19–43
|- align="center" bgcolor="bbffbb"
| 63 || August 15 || Brewers || 4–3 || Bomback (4–5) || Cleveland (2–2) || McLaughlin (4) || 12,467 || 20–43
|- align="center" bgcolor="ffbbbb"
| 64 || August 16 || Brewers || 6–2 || Caldwell (8–5) || Stieb (5–8) || Fingers (14) || || 20–44
|- align="center" bgcolor="ffbbbb"
| 65 || August 16 || Brewers || 2–0 || Lerch (4–6) || Todd (2–6) || Fingers (15) || 24,472 || 20–45
|- align="center" bgcolor="ffbbbb"
| 66 || August 17 || @ Royals || 5–3 || Gale (5–5) || Clancy (3–6) || Quisenberry (11) || 31,958 || 20–46
|- align="center" bgcolor="bbffbb"
| 67 || August 18 || @ Royals || 5–3 || Leal (4–8) || Jones (1–1) || Jackson (6) || 26,952 || 21–46
|- align="center" bgcolor="bbffbb"
| 68 || August 19 || @ Royals || 9–4 || Berenguer (2–4) || Leonard (7–8) || || 28,174 || 22–46
|- align="center" bgcolor="bbffbb"
| 69 || August 21 || White Sox || 5–4 || Stieb (6–8) || Farmer (2–3) || || 14,161 || 23–46
|- align="center" bgcolor="ffbbbb"
| 70 || August 22 || White Sox || 8–0 || Burns (8–2) || Clancy (3–7) || || 19,080 || 23–47
|- align="center" bgcolor="ffbbbb"
| 71 || August 23 || White Sox || 13–2 || Trout (7–4) || Leal (4–9) || || 16,486 || 23–48
|- align="center" bgcolor="ffbbbb"
| 72 || August 24 || Rangers || 3–0 || Medich (7–3) || Berenguer (2–5) || || 12,735 || 23–49
|- align="center" bgcolor="ffbbbb"
| 73 || August 25 || Rangers || 6–1 || Jenkins (5–6) || Stieb (6–9) || || 13,729 || 23–50
|- align="center" bgcolor="ffbbbb"
| 74 || August 27 || Royals || 11–5 || Martin (3–5) || Clancy (3–8) || || 14,704 || 23–51
|- align="center" bgcolor="bbffbb"
| 75 || August 28 || Royals || 4–3 || McLaughlin (1–5) || Brett (1–1) || || 13,230 || 24–51
|- align="center" bgcolor="ffbbbb"
| 76 || August 29 || Royals || 2–0 || Jones (2–1) || Berenguer (2–6) || Quisenberry (13) || 19,055 || 24–52
|- align="center" bgcolor="bbbbbb"
| – || August 30 || Royals || colspan=6|Postponed (rain) Not rescheduled
|- align="center" bgcolor="bbffbb"
| 77 || August 31 || @ Rangers || 3–0 || Stieb (7–9) || Jenkins (5–7) || || 8,034 || 25–52
|-

|- align="center" bgcolor="bbffbb"
| 78 || September 1 || @ Rangers || 9–3 || Clancy (4–8) || Darwin (8–7) || || 8,358 || 26–52
|- align="center" bgcolor="ffbbbb"
| 79 || September 2 || @ Rangers || 4–1 || Honeycutt (9–3) || Leal (4–10) || || 6,851 || 26–53
|- align="center" bgcolor="ffbbbb"
| 80 || September 3 || @ White Sox || 4–3 || Hoyt (6–3) || Berenguer (2–7) || || 6,669 || 26–54
|- align="center" bgcolor="bbffbb"
| 81 || September 4 || @ White Sox || 6–2 || Stieb (8–9) || Lamp (5–3) || || 18,317 || 27–54
|- align="center" bgcolor="bbffbb"
| 82 || September 5 || @ White Sox || 3–1 || Clancy (5–8) || Baumgarten (5–8) || McLaughlin (5) || 14,628 || 28–54
|- align="center" bgcolor="bbffbb"
| 83 || September 6 || @ White Sox || 3–2 || Leal (5–10) || Burns (8–3) || Jackson (7) || 11,250 || 29–54
|- align="center" bgcolor="ffbbbb"
| 84 || September 7 || @ Twins || 4–0 || Jackson (3–2) || Berenguer (2–8) || Corbett (9) || 5,024 || 29–55
|- align="center" bgcolor="ffbbbb"
| 85 || September 8 || @ Twins || 1–0 || Havens (2–4) || Stieb (8–10) || || 2,839 || 29–56
|- align="center" bgcolor="ffbbbb"
| 86 || September 9 || @ Twins || 3–1 || Arroyo (6–7) || Clancy (5–9) || Corbett (10) || 3,381 || 29–57
|- align="center" bgcolor="bbffbb"
| 87 || September 10 || Mariners || 2–0 || Leal (6–10) || Clay (0–6) || McLaughlin (6) || 11,685 || 30–57
|- align="center" bgcolor="ffbbbb"
| 88 || September 11 || Mariners || 8–1 || Abbott (3–6) || Berenguer (2–9) || || 12,023 || 30–58
|- align="center" bgcolor="bbffbb"
| 89 || September 12 || Mariners || 3–0 || Stieb (9–10) || Beattie (2–2) || || 14,048 || 31–58
|- align="center" bgcolor="ffbbbb"
| 90 || September 14 || Twins || 6–3 || Havens (3–4) || Clancy (5–10) || Corbett (13) || 11,402 || 31–59
|- align="center" bgcolor="bbffbb"
| 91 || September 15 || Twins || 4–2 || Leal (7–10) || Arroyo (6–8) || McLaughlin (7) || 12,037 || 32–59
|- align="center" bgcolor="ffbbbb"
| 92 || September 16 || Twins || 5–2 || Williams (5–8) || Berenguer (2–10) || || 11,733 || 32–60
|- align="center" bgcolor="bbffbb"
| 93 || September 18 || Angels || 5–1 || Murray (1–0) || Witt (5–9) || || 13,478 || 33–60
|- align="center" bgcolor="bbffbb"
| 94 || September 19 || Angels || 6–4 || Clancy (6–10) || Frost (1–7) || || 16,418 || 34–60
|- align="center" bgcolor="bbffbb"
| 95 || September 20 || Angels || 6–3 || Bomback (5–5) || Zahn (9–11) || McLaughlin (8) || 20,575 || 35–60
|- align="center" bgcolor="bbbbbb"
| – || September 21 || Athletics || colspan=6|Postponed (rain) Rescheduled for September 22
|- align="center" bgcolor="ffbbbb"
| 96 || September 22 || Athletics || 3–2 (13)|| Beard (1–1) || Leal (7–11) || || || 35–61
|- align="center" bgcolor="ffbbbb"
| 97 || September 22 || Athletics || 4–2 || McCatty (13–6) || Berenguer (2–11) || || 15,542 || 35–62
|- align="center" bgcolor="ffbbbb"
| 98 || September 23 || Athletics || 6–0 || Langford (11–9) || Clancy (6–11) || || 14,114 || 35–63
|- align="center" bgcolor="ffbbbb"
| 99 || September 25 || @ Angels || 11–5 || Zahn (10–11) || Leal (7–12) || || 19,890 || 35–64
|- align="center" bgcolor="ffbbbb"
| 100 || September 26 || @ Angels || 6–3 || Renko (8–4) || Berenguer (2–12) || Hassler (5) || 18,886 || 35–65
|- align="center" bgcolor="bbffbb"
| 101 || September 27 || @ Angels || 4–3 || Stieb (10–10) || Moreno (1–2) || McLaughlin (9) || 24,903 || 36–65
|- align="center" bgcolor="ffbbbb"
| 102 || September 29 || @ Athletics || 5–1 || Underwood (4–6) || Clancy (6–12) || || 10,998 || 36–66
|- align="center" bgcolor="ffbbbb"
| 103 || September 30 || @ Athletics || 3–0 || Norris (12–9) || Leal (7–13) || || 11,144 || 36–67
|-

|- align="center" bgcolor="ffbbbb"
| 104 || October 2 || @ Mariners || 8–3 || Clay (2–7) || Berenguer (2–13) || || 5,148 || 36–68
|- align="center" bgcolor="bbffbb"
| 105 || October 3 || @ Mariners || 4–3 || Stieb (11–10) || Abbott (4–9) || McLaughlin (10) || 8,653 || 37–68
|- align="center" bgcolor="ffbbbb"
| 106 || October 4 || @ Mariners || 2–0 || Bannister (9–9) || Todd (2–7) || Rawley (8) || 4,885 || 37–69
|-

| *An MLB Players strike forced the cancellation of all regular season games between June 12 and August 9.  A split-season format was adopted.

Player stats

Batting

Starters by position
Note: Pos = Position; G = Games played; AB = At bats; R = Runs scored; H = Hits; 2B = Doubles; 3B = Triples; Avg. = Batting average; HR = Home runs; RBI = Runs batted in; SB = Stolen bases

Other batters
Note: G = Games played; AB = At bats; R = Runs scored; H = Hits; 2B = Doubles; 3B = Triples; Avg. = Batting average; HR = Home runs; RBI = Runs batted in; SB = Stolen bases

Pitching

Starting pitchers
Note: G = Games pitched; GS = Games started; IP = Innings pitched; W = Wins; L = Losses; ERA = Earned run average; R = Runs allowed; ER = Earned runs allowed; BB = Walks allowed; K = Strikeouts

Other pitchers
Note: G = Games pitched; GS = Games started; IP = Innings pitched; W = Wins; L = Losses; SV = Saves; ERA = Earned run average; R = Runs allowed; ER = Earned runs allowed; BB = Walks allowed; K = Strikeouts

Relief pitchers
Note: G = Games pitched; IP = Innings pitched; W = Wins; L = Losses; SV = Saves; ERA = Earned run average; R = Runs allowed; ER = Earned runs allowed; BB = Walks allowed; K = Strikeouts

Award winners
All-Star Game
 Dave Stieb, Pitcher

Farm system

Notes

External links
1981 Toronto Blue Jays at Baseball Reference
1981 Toronto Blue Jays at Baseball Almanac

Toronto Blue Jays seasons
Toronto Blue Jays season
Toronto Blue Jays
Toronto Blue Jays